Space: 1889 is an adventure game developed by Paragon Software and published in 1990 for Amiga, Atari ST, and MS-DOS.

Plot
Space: 1889 is a science-fiction role-playing adventure based on the Space: 1889 role-playing game by Game Designers' Workshop. The game is set in the 19th-century Victorian era, a world where interplanetary travel was already accomplished, and discoveries have taken place such as liftwood on Mars in 1870 – a wood with antigravitational effects – and hydrogen-lifted airships. Great Britain is a constitutional monarchy, more interested in making her colonies profitable than with expanding her empire. The player creates five characters and endows each with skills and attributes. The game's scenario finds the lead character having been invited to a museum opening in London, to unveil several new Egyptian artifacts. During the evening, the player characters discover their first quest: to discover King Tut's tomb. There are several other quests involved, taking the character from London to San Francisco to the Far East, but also to Mars, Mercury, and beyond.

Reception
Todd Threadgill reviewed the game for Computer Gaming World, and stated that "Space 1889 is an intriguing product, and ideal for those who like adventures with a unique flavor. Players who revel in bloodshed should look elsewhere, but gamers who yearn for something different (and don't mind having a dash of history thrown in) will find what they're looking for in Space 1889."

Space: 1889 was reviewed in 1991 in Dragon #170 by Hartley, Patricia, and Kirk Lesser in "The Role of Computers" column. The reviewers gave the game 4 out of 5 stars. Computer Gaming Worlds Scorpia in 1993 stated that "Paragon's attempt to bring this paper RPG to life falls flat on its face". She criticized the graphics, plot, interface, combat, and ending, only recommending it to "hard-core Space 1889 (paper version) fans".

Reviews
CU Amiga - Jan, 1992
Amiga Power - Jan, 1992
Amiga Action - Feb, 1992
ASM (Aktueller Software Markt) - Jan, 1992
Amiga Format - Feb, 1992
Computer Gaming World - Mar, 1991

References

External links
Space: 1889 at heliograph.com
Space: 1889 at MobyGames
Space: 1889 at the Hall of Light

1990 video games
Alternate history video games
Amiga games
Atari ST games
DOS games
Empire Interactive games
MicroProse games
Role-playing video games
Space: 1889
Steampunk video games
Video games based on tabletop role-playing games
Video games developed in the United States
Video games featuring protagonists of selectable gender